The list of ship commissionings in 1966 includes a chronological list of all ships commissioned in 1966.


See also 

1966